is a Japanese dance/rock band.
Their second album, Commune, featured guest appearances of Keiko from Super Junky Monkey and eX-Girl. Dt. consists of members of many notable Japanese groups, including Dragon Ash.

Hide recently performed at a reunion concert with Super Junky Monkey.

Members 
HIROKI – guitar (previously in Dragon Ash)
natsu – vocals
HIDE – vocals 
FIRE – bass
YU-YA – drums

Discography

Singles 
SPY (2001/4/25)
胸いっぱいの愛を (2001/6/20)
夢の中へ (2001/8/8)
shiny (2004/11/25)
モンキーアパートパーティー中 (2005/7/13)
キズナ (2005/9/7) TBS 系列 Count Down TV オープニングテーマ
BEAST (2006/8/9)

LPs 
COMMUNE (2001/10/17)
Woofer Looper (2003/4/25)
OLDのROOKIE (2005/3/2)
hippopotamus (2005/11/2) (AVCD-17779)
コップポーン (2006/9/27)
CHECK YOUR HEADPHONE (2007/2/7)

References

External links 
Official Japanese site

Japanese rock music groups